Optimal Discriminant Analysis (ODA) and the related classification tree analysis (CTA) are exact statistical methods that maximize predictive accuracy. For any specific sample and exploratory or confirmatory hypothesis, optimal discriminant analysis (ODA) identifies the statistical model that yields maximum predictive accuracy, assesses the exact Type I error rate, and evaluates potential cross-generalizability. Optimal discriminant analysis may be applied to > 0 dimensions, with the one-dimensional case being referred to as UniODA and the multidimensional case being referred to as MultiODA.  Optimal discriminant analysis is an alternative to ANOVA (analysis of variance) and regression analysis.

See also

 Data mining
 Decision tree
 Factor analysis
 Linear classifier
 Logit (for logistic regression)
 Machine learning
 Multidimensional scaling
 Perceptron
 Preference regression
 Quadratic classifier
 Statistics

References

Notes

External links 
LDA tutorial using MS Excel
IMSL discriminant analysis function DSCRM, which has many useful mathematical definitions.

Classification algorithms

de:Diskriminanzanalyse
eo:Vikipedio:Projekto matematiko/Lineara diskriminanta analitiko
fr:Analyse discriminante linéaire
hr:Linearna analiza različitih
it:Analisi discriminante
nl:Discriminantanalyse
ja:判別分析
pl:Liniowa analiza dyskryminacyjna
ru:Дискриминантный анализ
sl:Diskriminantna analiza
zh:線性判別分析